KFSH may refer to:

KFSH-FM, a radio station licensed to La Mirada, California
King Faisal Specialist Hospital, a private hospital in Saudi Arabia